The White Chrysanthemum is an English musical in three acts by Arthur Anderson and Leedham Bantock, with lyrics by Anderson and music by Howard Talbot.  First produced at the Tyne Theatre, Newcastle, 23 April 1904, it opened at the Criterion Theatre, produced by Frank Curzon and directed by Austen Hurgon, on 31 August 1905 and ran for 179 performances, closing on 10 February 1906. The Japanese-themed musical starred Isabel Jay, Rutland Barrington, Lawrence Grossmith (a son of George Grossmith), and Henry Lytton.  Louie Pounds later joined the cast.  The musical enjoyed various international productions including one at the Kings Theatre in Melbourne, Australia in 1917 starring Barry Lupino.

Synopsis
Sybil Cunningham loves Reggie Armitage of the Royal Navy.  She has followed him from England to Japan partly to escape an unpleasant engagement in London.  They have asked his father's consent to their marriage, and in the meantime, he has arranged for a modest house for her to stay in.  His father the admiral, however, has decided that Reggie must marry a wealthy but vivacious American, Cornelia Vanderdecken.  Sybil disguises herself as a Japanese girl and hides from Cornelia, and Reggie's friend, Chippy helps her keep up the pretense.  But Sybil is distressed to see Reggie with Cornelia and runs away tearfully.  Fortunately, Reggie's servant, Sin Chong, and Sybil's cousin, Betty, reveal the true situation to Sybil.  In the end, Sybil returns to Reggie, Betty pairs off with Sir Horatio (who will agree to anything she wants), and Chippy lands Cornelia's heart.

Roles and original cast
Admiral Sir Horatio Armitage, K.C.B. (baritone) - Rutland Barrington  
Lieut. Reginald Armitage (His son)  (baritone) - Henry Lytton  
Lieut. Chippendale Belmont (Reggie's friend) - Lawrence Grossmith  
Sin Chong (Reginald's Chinese servant) - M. R. Morand  
Cornelia Vanderdecken (An American heiress) - Marie George  
Betty Kenyon (A young widow, Cousin to Sybil) - Millie Legarde  
Sybil Cunningham (Known as O San, "The White Chrysanthemum")  (soprano) - Isabel Jay

Musical numbers
Act I  -  A Bungalow on the Sea Shore, Japan
No. 1 - Overture 
No. 2 - Prelude and Song - Sybil - "It was just an old-world village..." 
No. 3 - Duet - Sybil and Betty - "A White Chrysanthemum." 
No. 4 - Song - Reggie - "There's a dear little lady I love..." 
No. 5 - Song - Sybil - "The butterfly and the flower." 
No. 6 - Song - Sin Chong, with Japanese Girls - "Just when-ee day is dawning..." 
No. 7 - Duet - Sybil and Reggie - "When you are my very own..." 
No. 8 - Finale Act I - (during dialogue)

Act II  -  A Chrysanthemum Garden outside the Bungalow
No. 9 - Introduction to Act II 
No. 10 - Quintet - Cornelia, Reggie, Chippy, Admiral and Lee - "Hide and Seek." 
No. 11 - Song - Chippy - "I've never been in love before..." 
No. 12 - Duet - Admiral and Betty - "As you have accepted my suggestion..." 
No. 13 - Concerted Number - Sin Chong and Chorus - "Little Japanesee if you wishee pleasee..." 
No. 14 - Song - Cornelia - "The only pebble on the beach." 
No. 15 - Finale Act II

Act III  -  Reggie's Snuggery in the Bungalow
Nos. 16 & 17 - Prelude to Act III, and Song - Reggie - "You can't please everybody always..."   
No. 18 - Concerted Number - Sin Chong and Chorus - "When little boys and girls are good..." 
No. 19 - Song - Sybil - "Time was when my love was kind to me..." 
No. 20 - Song - Cornelia - "Down by an old plantation homestead..." 
No. 21 - Duet - Cornelia and Chippy - "Suppose we settle down and take a house in town..." 
No. 22 - Recitation Music (Betty) - "A Hint." 
No. 23 - Song - Admiral - "I've traversed the sea from a far distant shore..." 
No. 24 - Sextet - Sybil, Cornelia, Reggie, Chippy, Admiral and Betty - "We've got to settle the parson..."

References

External links
Midi files and cast list
Information, reviews and many photos of the original production
Extensive article about the original production in The Play Pictorial, vol. 6, pp. 137–64, Greening & Co., Ltd., 1905

1905 musicals
West End musicals
Musicals by Howard Talbot
British musicals